Harpalus son of Polemaeus from Beroea, was a Macedonian statesman, hieromnemon  at Delphi and the chief of the ambassadors sent by Perseus to Rome in 172 BC, to answer the complaints of Eumenes II, king of Pergamon. Harpalus gave great offence to the Romans by the haughty and vehement tone that he assumed, and exacerbated the irritation already existing against Perseus.

References
Tataki, Argyro B. / Macedonians Abroad. A Contribution to the Prosopography of Ancient Macedonia

Third Macedonian War
Ancient Beroeans
Ambassadors in Greek Antiquity
Ambassadors to ancient Rome
2nd-century BC Macedonians
Ambassadors of Macedonia (ancient kingdom)